WR 102 is a Wolf–Rayet star in the constellation Sagittarius, an extremely rare star on the WO oxygen sequence.  It is a luminous and very hot star, highly evolved and close to exploding as a supernova.

Discovery
WR 102 was first mentioned as the possible optical counterpart to a peculiar X-ray source GX 3+1.  However, it became clear that it was a separate object and in 1971 it was highlighted as a luminous star with unusual OVI emission lines in its spectrum.  It was classified as a WC star, an unusual one because of the highly ionised emission lines, and not the central star of a planetary nebula.  It was seen to vary in brightness and was given the variable star designation V3893 Sagittarii in the 62nd name-list of variable stars.

Faint nebulosity was discovered around WR 102 in 1981 and was identified as a wind-blown bubble.  In 1982, a set of five luminous stars with highly ionised oxygen emission lines, including WR 102, was used to define the WO class of Wolf–Rayet stars.  They were identified as highly evolved massive stars.

Features

WR 102, of spectral classification WO2, is one of the very few known oxygen-sequence Wolf–Rayet stars, just four in the Milky Way galaxy and six in external galaxies. WR 102 was likely born from the OB association Sagittarius OB5.

Very strong stellar winds with a terminal velocity of 5,000 kilometers per second are causing WR 102 to lose /year.  For comparison, the Sun loses (2-3) x 10−14 solar masses per year due to its solar wind, several hundred million times less than WR 102. These winds and the strong ultraviolet radiation from the hot star have compressed and ionised the surrounding interstellar material into a complex series of arcs described as the bubble type of Wolf–Rayet nebula.

Evolutionary status
WO stars are the last evolutionary stage of the most massive stars before exploding as supernovae. It is very likely that WR 102 is on its last stages of nuclear fusion, near or beyond the end of helium burning.

It has been calculated that WR 102 will explode as a supernova within 1,500 years. High mass and rapid rotation would make a gamma-ray burst (GRB) possible, but it is unclear if WR 102 is rotating rapidly. It was previously thought that the projected rotation velocity within the stellar wind could be as fast as 1,000 km/s but spectropolarimetric observations seem to indicate that if WR 102 is rotating, it is rotating at a much lower speed.

See also
WR 142
WR 30a
WR 93b
List of supernova candidates

References

Sagittarius (constellation)
Wolf–Rayet stars
Sagittarii, V3893
Astronomical events in the near future